Nava Ghantila is a village of Surendranagar district in the Indian state of Gujarat, with approximately 600 residents. It is located near to Tikar.

Villages in Surendranagar district